Clone or Clones or Cloning or Cloned or The Clone may refer to:

Places
 Clones, County Fermanagh, Ireland
 Clones, County Monaghan, a town in Ireland
 Clones railway station, Ireland

Biology
 Clone (B-cell), a lymphocyte clone, the massive presence of which may indicate a pathological condition
 Clone (cell biology), a group of identical cells that share a common ancestry
 Clonal plant, the result of asexual, vegetative reproduction when a new plant grows from a fragment of the parent plant
 Cloning, the production of any organism whose genetic information is identical to that of a parent organism from which it was created

Computing and technology
 Clone (computing), computer hardware or software designed to function in the same way as an original
 Video game clone, a software game or game franchise heavily inspired by another
 Clones (video game), a video game clone Lemmings
 Clone (Java method), a method in the Java programming language for object duplication
 Clone (Linux system call), in C, whereby a process creates a copy of itself
 Clone, a popular term for a replica, particularly when referring to "recreations" of rare and desirable variants of collector cars
 Clone, a popular term for an unlicensed, reverse engineered copy of a firearm produced in another nation (although the term can also apply to a simple direct copy, created under license)
 Clone tool, a tool used in image manipulation programs
 Phone cloning, the copying of identity from one cellular device to another
 Quantum cloning, the replication of a quantum state

Mathematics
 Clone (algebra), a collection of functions with certain properties
 Clone (voting), in voting systems analysis, a candidate identical to one already present in an election

Arts, entertainment, and media

Comics
 Clone (comic), a 2012–2014 comic book series
 "Clone Saga", a storyline from Marvel Comics' Spider-Man comic books

Films
 Cloned (film), a 1997 made-for-television film
 Clone (2010 film), a 2010 film originally released as Womb
 The Clones, 1973 American film directed by Lamar Card, featuring Michael Greene, Gregory Sierra and Otis Young

Television
 , a 2001–2002 Brazilian telenovela
 Clone (TV series), a 2008 BBC comedy series
 , a 2010 Spanish-language telenovela
 Clone High, a 2002 American animated TV show

Literature
 Clones (anthology), a 1998 short-story anthology edited by Jack Dann and Gardner Dozois
"The Clone", a 1959 short story by Theodore L. Thomas
The Clone, a 1965 novel by Theodore L. Thomas and Kate Wilhelm

Music

Albums
 Clone (Leo Kottke and Mike Gordon album), 2002
 Clone (Threshold album), 1998
 Clones (album), a 2003 album by The Neptunes

Songs
 "Clone", a song by Gojira from their album Terra Incognita
 "Clone", a song by Metric from their album Synthetica
 "Clone", a song by Vision of Disorder from their album Imprint
 "Clones" (Ash song), a 2004 single from Irish alternative rock band Ash
 "Clones", a song by Chevelle from their album Hats Off to the Bull
 "Clones", a song by Cult of Luna from their album The Beyond
 "Clones", a song by The Roots on the album Illadelph Halflife
 "Clones (We're All)", a song recorded by Alice Cooper on his Flush the Fashion album

Other uses in arts, entertainment, and media
 Clone Wars (disambiguation)
 Clones (video game), a 2010 video game

See also
 Clon (disambiguation)
 Clonal (disambiguation)
 Cloning (disambiguation)
 List of animals that have been cloned